Clavus coffea is a species of sea snail, a marine gastropod mollusk in the family Drilliidae.

Description
The ovate shell has an acuminate apex. The color of the shell is red with white ribs in the middle. The fine apical whorls are small and produced suddenly into a cone. The shell contains 9 slightly convex whorls. The length of the aperture equals 7/17th of the length of the shell. The columella is callous and covered with tubercles at the suture. The anal sinus is small and located under a tubercle. The siphonal canal is very short.

Distribution
This species is found in the demersal zone of the Western Central Pacific Ocean off the Philippines.

References

 Tucker, J.K. 2004 Catalog of recent and fossil turrids (Mollusca: Gastropoda). Zootaxa 682:1–1295

coffea
Gastropods described in 1882